The 1980 Eastern 8 Conference baseball tournament was held on May 18 and 19, 1980 to determine the champion of the NCAA Division I Eastern 8 Conference, renamed in 1982 as the Atlantic 10 Conference, for the 1980 NCAA Division I baseball season.  This was the second iteration of the event, and was held on The Ellipse, home field of George Washington, in Washington, D.C.   won the championship and the conference's automatic bid to the 1980 NCAA Division I baseball tournament.

Format
The tournament followed a double-elimination format, with Duquesne receiving a first round bye.

Bracket

References

Championship Series
Atlantic 10 Conference Baseball Tournament
Eastern 8 Conference Baseball Championship Series
Eastern 8 Conference Baseball Championship Series
Baseball in Washington, D.C.
College sports in Washington, D.C.
Sports competitions in Washington, D.C.